Funnel Web is a 1962 Australian TV play starring Grant Taylor and written by Phillip Grenville Mann. It screened on the ABC and was a suspense drama.

Plot
A Canadian woman, Nina, is searching for her husband, Max Godfrey, who deserted her years ago. She finds him living in Sydney. Max has also defrauded his business partner. He decides to take steps to get rid of both his ex-wife and former business partner.

Cast
Grant Taylor as Max Godfrey
Diana Davidson as Nina Godfrey
Wendy Playfair as Nina Godfrey
Alastair Duncan as Paul Charlton
Phillipa Baker as Marion Westlake
Mary Mackay as Miss Wetherby
Stewart Ginn as Dt Sgt Lundy
Ken Hacker as Gleeson

1956 British TV version
It was based on a story by Phillip Grenville Mann. He originally wrote it as a 30-minute TV play for British TV called "Dead or Alive". This aired in 1956 as part of the anthology series Theatre Royal, hosted by Lilli Palmer. The episode starred Australian actor Ron Randell and was directed by Don Chaffey, who would later work in Australia. Other actors included Ralph Michael, Patricia Driscoll, Lloyd Lamble and John Miller.

Mann expanded the story into a full length stage play, which was performed in Britain.

Development

Mann adapted the story for Australian TV. According to Filmink "A lot of TV plays around this time sound as though they were inspired by Dial M for Murder, which started as a TV play, i.e. tales of murder among the monied classes." 

It was the last in a series of live TV plays by Australian authors on the ABC which had been announced in March 1962. The others were:
Boy Round the Corner
The House of Mancello
The Teeth of the Wind
The Hobby Horse
Jenny

Production
It was Grant Taylor's second TV performance following Jenny and was shot in Sydney. The set, including two office interiors and a beach house at Avalon, was designed by Francesca Crespi. Technical supervisor John Garton was a veteran of many ABC plays and operas. Director Bill Bain said "the play is an excellent vehicle for actors and producer, being slick, tight and dynamic."

Reception
The Sydney Morning Herald praised "the meticulously chic settings designed by Francesca Crespi (a beach house at Avalon and a Sydney office interior) and the easy-limbed, masterful portrayal of the villain by Grant Taylor".

See also
List of television plays broadcast on Australian Broadcasting Corporation (1960s)

External links
Funnel Web at National Film and Sound Archive
Funnel Web at IMDb

References

Black-and-white Australian television shows
1960s Australian television plays